Alexander Nissman (born January 15, 1990) is a United States Virgin Islands international footballer who plays as a midfielder.

Career statistics

International

References

External links
 Alexander Nissman at CaribbeanFootballDatabase

1990 births
Living people
United States Virgin Islands soccer players
United States Virgin Islands international soccer players
United States Virgin Islands under-20 international soccer players
Association football midfielders